Quilín is a freeway-median metro station on the Line 4 of the Santiago Metro, in Santiago, Chile. It acts as a central support structure for the northern bridge of a roundabout interchange called Quilín. The station was opened on 2 March 2006 as part of the connection between Grecia and  Vicente Valdés.

The station features an undulating roof whose central portion is part of the road deck of the aforementioned bridge. It has a mezzanine on its southern end; the mezzanine is connected to two exits by a curved grade-separated walkway, which consists of a footbridge at the center and two pedestrian tunnels at both ends.

References

Santiago Metro stations
Railway stations opened in 2006
Railway stations in highway medians
Santiago Metro Line 4